Presa Sangregado Dam (also known as Arenal Dam and Sangregado Dam) is a high-earthen hydroelectric dam on the south-east shore of Lake Arenal in the Guanacaste Province of northwest Costa Rica. The installed hydroelectric capacity is 157 megawatts . The hydroelectric power plant is operated by Instituto Costarricense de Electricidad.

See also 

 List of power stations in Costa Rica

References

Dams in Costa Rica
Hydroelectric power stations in Costa Rica
Lake Arenal
Dams completed in 1979
Buildings and structures in Guanacaste Province